"Broken Ones" is a pop song written by Dana Parish, Andrew Hollander and Andy Love, and performed by American recording artist Jacquie Lee. It was released on May 13, 2014 as her debut single after placing second on The Voice, and the lead single of her EP, also titled Broken Ones (2014). "Broken Ones" impacted American hot adult contemporary radio in June 2014.

Background
Lee describes the song by saying "part of the human experience is the imperfection that goes with it." Also she states "everyone of us is broken in some way, shape or form. Even if you don't want to admit it, you have to be real with yourself. If you don't admit it, maybe you internalize it, maybe I am a little bit broken."

Critical reception
Lyndsey Parker of Rolling Stone gave the song a favorable review, saying "Broken Ones is a mature-beyond-Jacquie's-years piano power ballad, very Sarah McLachlan/Christina Perri in feel, with tastefully spare production that places the prodigy's voice (of course) front and center." Similarly, Chris Jordan of Asbury Park Press (part of the USA Today Network) gave Lee a positive review, saying "powerful but not overblown and serene but not sappy, "Broken Ones" frames Lee's voice around a strong melody, a sweeping chorus and uplifting, yet vulnerable, lyrics." Lucas Villa of AXS TV also cited stylistic similarities to Christina Perri and wrote that "Lee's vocals soar to new heights" and proves that "there is still life beyond [The Voice]" for Lee.

Track listing

Music video
An accompanying music video was directed by Max Nichols and follows a group of "down-on-their-luck teenage girls" as they discover their creative identities in an abandoned building. The video premiered October 24, 2014.

Chart performance

Release history

References

2014 songs
2014 singles
Pop ballads
Songs written by Dana Parish
Atlantic Records singles